Juan José Martin Bravo (27 October 1995) is a Chilean climate activist. He is president of CVerde, and he was a general coordinator of the COY15 (World Youth Conference) In 2018, Cverde was awarded the National Environmental Award of Chile.

Life 
He is a student at Pontificia Universidad Católica.

In 2019, he was a climate youth delegate to the United Nations.

He was a candidate for National Congress of Chile in the 2021 general election. He is a member of the Non-Neutral Independents party. In 2021, he participated in the Convention Regulation Commission, including ecocide, in the environmental history.

References

External links 
 BCN Profile
 Juan Jose Martin Bravo independientesnoneutrales.cl
 Juanjo Martin, 46. JUAN JOSE MARTIN BRAVO, www.votosimple.com

1996 births
Living people
Chilean politicians
Chilean activists
Non-Neutral Independents politicians
Members of the Chilean Constitutional Convention
Pontifical Catholic University of Chile alumni